Gilda Holst Molestina (born 1952) is an Ecuadorian writer and professor. Her narrative makes use of humor and irony, in addition to the treatment of themes related to gender inequality.

Biography
Gilda Holst was born in Guayaquil in 1952. She completed her secondary studies at the American College, and higher education at the Universidad Católica de Santiago de Guayaquil, where she obtained a licentiate in literature in 1984.

She began her literary career in the 1980s. In 1985, she entered the literary workshops of writer Miguel Donoso Pareja. Her first book of short stories, Más sin nombre que nunca, was published in 1989, and included the short story "Reunión", the plot of which follows a woman who is rejected by her husband and friends because of her body odor. This received great critical interest for her exploration of the feminine perspective in masculine environments.

She has also dedicated herself to teaching, working for several years as a professor of literature at the Universidad Católica, where she eventually directed the School of Letters.

Regarding her writing, the Venezuelan writer  observes:

Her Complete Works were published by Editorial Cadáver Exquisito in 2021.

Works

Short stories

References

1952 births
21st-century Ecuadorian women writers
Ecuadorian novelists
Ecuadorian short story writers
Ecuadorian women novelists
Ecuadorian women short story writers
Living people
People from Guayaquil
Universidad Católica de Santiago de Guayaquil alumni